David Lewis (1823 – 4 December 1885), was a British merchant and philanthropist.

Biography
Lewis was born to a Jewish family in London. Settling in Liverpool in 1840, he had by 1856 accumulated enough capital to start his own business as a boys' clothier in Bold street. Subsequently, he opened a second establishment; and thereafter he gradually developed one of the largest retail businesses of the kind in England, erecting an establishment of the "Universal Provider" or department store class (Lewis's). Similar stores were founded by him in Manchester, Sheffield, and Birmingham.

Philanthropy
Lewis's ample means were freely given in aid of charitable and philanthropic works. He headed the local subscription list for the persecuted Jews of Russia with a donation of £1,000 ($5,000), and gave large sums in support of the synagogue. For many years he held the position of warden and treasurer of the Old Hebrew Congregation, Liverpool. He died in Liverpool

At his death he bequeathed very large sums (nearly a half-million sterling) for the erection of hospitals and other philanthropic institutions, which constitute some of the most important in Liverpool.  The David Lewis Centre based in Little Warford, Cheshire, a charity providing residential accommodation for people with epilepsy and other neurological conditions, continues to operate under the David Lewis name, having been established with the funds from his estate.

He died in 1885 and is buried next to his wife Bertha in Deane Road cemetery, Kensington, Liverpool.

See also
Lewis's

References

Sources

Jew. Chron. and Jew. World, 11 Dec. 1885.
Liverpool Leader, 6 Dec. 1875.

1823 births
1885 deaths
English Jews
English philanthropists
Businesspeople from Liverpool
British businesspeople in retailing
19th-century British philanthropists
19th-century English businesspeople